Jonmo Theke Jolchi (English: 'am Suffering from the Birth) is a 1981 Bangladeshi film starring Bulbul Ahmed, Bobita and Anwara. It received Bachsas Awards in 3 categories that year.

Cast 
 Bobita
 Bulbul Ahmed
 Anwara

Music
It received 3 out of four musical awards in 1981 Bachsas Awards. 
"Ekbar Jodi Keu Bhalobasto (male)" - Syed Abdul Hadi
"Ekbar Jodi Keu Bhalobasto (female)" - Samina Chowdhury
"Jonmo Theke Jolchi Mago" - Sabina Yasmin

Awards 
Bachsas Awards
Best Music Direction - Alauddin Ali
Best Male Playback Singer - Syed Abdul Hadi
Best Female Playback Singer - Samina Chowdhury

References

1981 films
Bengali-language Bangladeshi films
Films scored by Alauddin Ali
1980s Bengali-language films